Fernacre, also known as Fernacre stone circle or Fernacre circle, is a stone circle located on the slopes of the De Lank River,  northeast of St Breward on Bodmin Moor in Cornwall in the United Kingdom.

Description
It has been suggested to mean bracken-land or come from the old plural for fairy; feren, who were said to be sacred to the ancient Cornish. Fernacre is one of the biggest stone circles in Cornwall. Fernacre is a marker for the start of a medieval drove road from Rough Tor to Garrow.

Archaeology
The ruins of what was called Fernacre farm were first recorded in 1327 AD. Numerous hut circles dot the landscape nearby and it has been suggested that the dating for Fernacre is contemporary with these. No bones or remains were found in these hut circles, only a few flaked flints gave clues to its occupation. The Fernacre settlement covered 164 acres, of which 84 show signs of having been farmed. The dating of the sites is uncertain although it has been suggested to have been constructed either in the Neolithic or Bronze Age. There are signs that the circle had a retaining bank of earth on its southeast.

Alignments
Fernacre carries a pivotal location between Rough Tor located due north and Brown Willy located due east. Garrow Tor also lies to the east and Louden Hill to the west-southwest. It is only 100 ft from being in a direct line in an easterly direction between Stannon and Brown Willy Cairns, another small erect stone stands in this line eastwards on the way to Brown Willy which has been suggested to mark the equinox sunrise. William Page note that when viewed from the centre of Fernacre circle the sunset on 1 May would align approximately with Louden Hill.

Literature

References

External links

 Cornwall's Archaeological Heritage – field guide to accessible sites – Fernacre stone circle
 Illustrated entry in the Megalithic Portal
 Illustrated entry in the Modern Antiquarian
 Pastscape – English Heritage entry about Fernacre stone circle
 

Bodmin Moor
Stone circles in Cornwall